Peter Kyle (born 9 September 1970) is a British politician serving as Shadow Secretary of State for Northern Ireland since 2021. A member of the Labour Party, he has been Member of Parliament (MP) for Hove since 2015.

A former charity sector executive, he previously served as a Shadow Justice Minister from 2020 to 2021 and a Shadow Education Minister in 2021.

Early life and career
Kyle grew up in West Sussex and moved to Brighton and Hove in 1996. He later gained a doctorate in community development from the University of Sussex. In 2006, he became a Cabinet Office special advisor  focusing on social exclusion policy.

He worked as an aid worker in Eastern Europe and the Balkans helping young people whose lives had been affected by the political instability created by war.

From 2007 to 2013, he was deputy chief executive of ACEVO. In 2013, he became chief executive of Working for Youth, a newly formed charity focusing on helping unemployed youth.

Parliamentary career
In the 2015 election, Kyle was elected with a majority of 1,236, increasing that to 18,757 in the 2017 election and holding the seat in 2019 with a slightly reduced majority of 17,044.

Positions and votes
He sat on the Business, Energy and Industrial Strategy Select Committee between 2016 and 2020, where he questioned Mike Ashley, boss of Sports Direct, over poor working practices in his warehouses. Ashley accused Kyle of making "defamatory comments" against him and called for the MP to stand down from the committee.

Kyle is the co-chair of the All Party Parliamentary Group on Southern Rail.

He campaigned for remain during the EU membership referendum, 2016. In June 2018, he said "Brexit is a big deal but it's not a done deal". In March 2019, alongside fellow Labour MP Phil Wilson, Kyle put forward an amendment to Theresa May's Brexit Withdrawal Agreement. Dubbed the "Kyle-Wilson" amendment, it aimed to pass the Withdrawal Agreement Bill on the condition that the deal on offer would go back to the British people through a confirmatory vote. Whilst failing to pass twice in the House of Commons, it came closest to a majority; only 12 votes short on its second attempt. Both Kyle and Wilson signalled that they would bring back the amendment if Boris Johnson was to return with a Brexit deal in October 2019.

In September 2020, Kyle was appointed a vice-chair of Labour Friends of Israel.

Shadow Minister for Victims and Youth Justice 
In April 2020, he became the Shadow Minister for Victims and Youth Justice. He has campaigned on the issue of 'sex for rent' and demanded a change to the law for landlords who engage in sexual exploitation of tenants.

In February 2021, Kyle presented a bill for victims to Parliament which had the aims of:

 Ensuring victims are read their rights at the same time as perpetrators
 Creating a register for people who run departments in the justice system which routinely ignore victims' rights
 Giving victims of persistent anti-social behaviour the same rights as victims of crimes
 Making the Victims' Commissioner independent of government and able to launch their own investigations.

Shadow Minister for Schools 
In a minor Labour reshuffle in May 2021, Kyle was promoted to succeed Wes Streeting as the Shadow Minister for Schools.

Shadow Northern Ireland Secretary 
He was appointed Shadow Northern Ireland Secretary in the November 2021 British shadow cabinet reshuffle.

Political views
Kyle backed Liz Kendall in the 2015 Labour leadership election, and supported Owen Smith in the failed attempt to replace Jeremy Corbyn in the 2016 Labour Party leadership election.

He was in favour of the UK remaining in the European Union. In February 2019, he drafted an amendment to accept the government's Brexit deal on the basis it would go to a public vote as a second referendum. Alongside deputy leader Tom Watson, he advocated for this position to become Labour policy. Following Labour's defeat in the 2019 United Kingdom general election, Kyle urged Labour leader Jeremy Corbyn to resign, saying that the loss was not related to Labour's position on Brexit but rather to Corbyn's incompetent leadership.

He has championed apprenticeships, pledging to create 1,000 apprenticeships in 1,000 days in co-operation with the council and via the creation of a Greater Brighton Employer Skills Task Force.

He has called for the voting age to be lowered to 16 and put forward his own bill on the subject in 2017.

He endorsed Jess Phillips in the 2020 Labour Party leadership election.

In September 2022, he spoke in favour of Labour accepting Brexit and presenting a "positive vision for a better Britain" outside of the European Union.

Personal life
He was chair of governors of Brighton Aldridge Community Academy.

Kyle has dyslexia. He is openly gay.

References

External links

1970 births
Living people
Alumni of the University of Sussex
Labour Party (UK) MPs for English constituencies
UK MPs 2015–2017
UK MPs 2017–2019
UK MPs 2019–present
British special advisers
Gay politicians
LGBT members of the Parliament of the United Kingdom
English LGBT politicians
Politicians from Brighton and Hove
Politicians with dyslexia